The men's team sabre was one of four fencing events on the Fencing at the 1908 Summer Olympics programme.  The event was won by the Hungarian team, who also took the top two medals in the individual sabre event. Each nation could enter a team of up to 8 fencers, with 4 fencers chosen for each match.

Competition format

The tournament used a variant of the Bergvall system, holding a single elimination bracket for the gold medal with a repechage ending in a match for silver and bronze. Each match featured 4 fencers from one team facing 4 fencers from the other team, for a total of 16 individual bouts. Bouts were to 3 touches.

With 8 teams, the main bracket consisted of quarterfinals, semifinals, and a final. Teams defeated by the gold medalist in the main bracket moved to the repechage. With 3 teams in the repechage, a repechage "semifinal" and "final" (which awarded the silver medal to the winner and bronze medal to the loser) were scheduled (Bohemia did not contest the repechage final).

Results

Main bracket

First round

Winners advanced, losers out.  The team that was defeated by the eventual champions moved to the repechage.

Semifinals

Winners advanced to play for the gold medal, loser to eventual champion was sent to repechage.

Final

The winner received the gold medal, while the loser had to play the winner of the repechage in the silver medal match.

Repechage

Germany and Italy had been defeated by Hungary, the winner of the final, in the first two rounds.  The two teams faced each other for the right to advance to the silver medal match against the loser of the final.

Round 1

Silver medal match

The winner took the silver medal, with loser receiving bronze.  The Bohemian team refused to play the match, arguing that as finalists they had already secured second place.  The organizing committee awarded silver medals to Italy, relegating the Bohemian team to bronze medals.

Notes

Sources
 
 De Wael, Herman. Herman's Full Olympians: "Fencing 1908". Accessed 1 May 2006.

Men's team sabre